Wayne Black and Kevin Ullyett were the defending champions, but Black retired in 2006, and only Ullyett competed that year.
Ullyett partnered with Paul Hanley, but Bob Bryan and Mike Bryan defeated them 6–3, 7–5, in the final.

Seeds
All seeds receive a bye into the second round.

Draw

Finals

Top half

Bottom half

External links
Association of Tennis Professionals (ATP) draw

Masters - Doubles